Kengo: Master of Bushido is a fighting game and the first entry in the Kengo series. Developed by Genki, it was released for the PlayStation 2 as Kengo in Japan on December 14, 2000 and as Kengo: Master of Bushido in North America and Europe on January 3, 2001 and March 30, 2001 respectively by Crave Entertainment.

Gameplay
The single-player game is divided into three sections. The first two are training and challenging other schools. Training is divided into multiple mini-games that focus on one aspect of gaming, timing or button combos for example. The training serves to increase the maximum value of various character statistics, but not augment their actual value. The simple nature of the training quickly becomes repetitive. Challenging the other schools consists of fighting four identical-looking students, one unique student, and the school's master. The battles use wooden swords but are consecutive and of increasing difficulty, you regain a small amount of health between matches.

After defeating each rival school, the player must earn their place as the head of a school. Randomly, the player will have access to the Imperial Tournament, which is the final goal of the game. The tournament is fought with steel swords and start each match with full health. The player can still challenge other schools and victory earns their school's sword. Equipping different swords gives you a unique "special move". At this point in the game the player will be randomly challenged by either the master or unique student of other schools and cannot decline. Losing such random encounters strips the character of that school's sword. Both the life and Ki bars can be hidden from battle, and the status of a wounded character is displayed during battle.

Offense is composed of four "stances" and one special move. A special move may not always be available depending on what sword is equipped.  A special move is executed by pressing triangle when the Ki bar is full. The Ki bar can be filled by pressing triangle or by fighting well. Each "stance" is selected with the shoulder buttons and is composed of three moves. The moves are always executed in sequence and can be augmented by character's proximity to one another, the analog stick, or pressing another button during the combo. Outside of battle, the four stances can be re-designed by replacing one or all of the three moves with other moves earned throughout the game.

Reception

Chester Barber reviewed the PlayStation 2 version of the game for Next Generation, rating it four stars out of five, and stated that "With a deep fighting engine and great replay value, you'll be playing this one for weeks. If you loved Bushido Blade, Kengo is definitely a must-buy."

The game received "mixed" reviews according to video game review aggregator Metacritic. In Japan, Famitsu gave it a score of 31 out of 40.

References

2000 video games
Crave Entertainment games
Fighting games
Genki (company) games
Multiplayer and single-player video games
PlayStation 2 games
PlayStation Network games
Ubisoft games
Video games developed in Japan
Video games scored by Takayuki Nakamura
Video games set in feudal Japan